"Agua Mala" is the thirteenth episode of the sixth season of the science fiction television series The X-Files. It premiered on the Fox network on February 21, 1999, in the United States. The episode was written by David Amann, and directed by Rob Bowman. The episode is a "Monster-of-the-Week" story, unconnected to the series' wider mythology. "Agua Mala" earned a Nielsen household rating of 10.1, being watched by 16.9 million people in its initial broadcast. The episode received mostly mixed to negative reviews.

The show centers on FBI special agents Fox Mulder (David Duchovny) and Dana Scully (Gillian Anderson) who work on cases linked to the paranormal, called X-Files. Mulder is a believer in the paranormal, while the skeptical Scully has been assigned to debunk his work. In this episode, Arthur Dales, now living in a Florida trailer park, calls Mulder and Scully for help when a neighboring family disappears; and, with a hurricane approaching, Mulder and Scully find themselves trapped with a group of residents in a building where there is something in the water.

"Agua Mala" was Amann's second story for The X-Files. The original idea for the episode featured a monster loose in an abandoned gold mine. Darren McGavin makes a second appearance as Arthur Dales after being introduced in "Travelers." After suffering a stroke, he would later be replaced by M. Emmet Walsh in "The Unnatural." The episode was notable for its sheer amount of water and its lack of bright lighting, a stylistic approach that Gillian Anderson likened to filming in Vancouver.

Plot
In Goodland, Florida, during a fierce hurricane, Sara Shipley and her son, Evan, desperately try to flip the washing machine but fail to do so as tentacles ensnare them. After receiving a call, FBI special agents Fox Mulder (David Duchovny) and Dana Scully (Gillian Anderson) arrive at the home of retired FBI agent Arthur Dales (Darren McGavin), the first to look into the X-Files. He tells them about the Shipley family and how Sara Shipley called him in a panic after her husband was attacked by something in the bathroom with tentacles. Scully is dubious about this but believes that something has indeed happened to the Shipley family during this hurricane.

Mulder and Scully go to the Shipley house and find the bathroom door barricaded shut, no sign of any people. The two have a brief run-in with Deputy Greer who believes they are burglars until Mulder disarms the man and Scully shows him her FBI ID. They attempt to go to the airport but are trapped by the hurricane. Elsewhere at the Breakers Condominiums, Deputy Greer encounters the creature after finding a dead man covered in a slimy substance on a toilet. Mulder and Scully later find the deputy's vehicle parked outside the apartments. Searching the building, they discover Greer on the ground, his neck covered with red welts. Mulder goes around the complex to find the rest of the people and warn them that the thing is in the plumbing. He encounters Dougie, a looter, Walter Suarez whose girlfriend Angela Villareal is nine months pregnant, and George Vincent, an anti-government gun rights activist. Mulder attempts to get Vincent to come out and join them for his own protection. Vincent refuses but, after being attacked by the creature in his apartment, relents. Mulder hypothesizes that the entity attacking them was driven from the bottom of the sea by the hurricane into the city's water system.

Dougie steals the deputy's wedding ring and knocks over a container of Epsom salts into the tub where the unconscious Greer is soaking after Scully removed several specimens from his neck wounds. While Angela Villareal relieves herself, she spots the creature in the tub with the deputy. Mulder and Scully enter the bathroom and find the clothes of the deputy but the man gone. Mulder theorizes that the entity does not just live in water but is a living form of water, becoming visible only when it attacks. He believes that the creature uses people as hosts to reproduce, with the body's water content being used to feed the growth of new creatures. Mulder realizes that everyone needs to evacuate.

Charging outside, Mulder is attacked by the creature in the hall. When he returns with the welts all over his throat, George Vincent slams the door and takes them all hostage, leaving Mulder to die in the hallway. Angela goes into labor and Scully finds herself forced to deliver a baby. However, water collects in the light fixture above them and the creature appears. It grabs George Vincent by the neck. Scully tells Walter Suarez to aim for the sprinklers, realizing that the freshwater kept the creature at bay, as with the deputy until Epsom salt was added to the water. Suarez shoots them and saves Vincent's life. Meanwhile, Mulder realizes that freshwater is the key also, and runs out into the rain to heal his wounds.

The next morning, the creature has vanished, the newborn baby has survived and is healthy, and Mulder starts recovering quite well. After hearing the agents' story, a relieved Dales says that he would have not retired from the FBI if he had had a partner like Scully. He decides to celebrate with the agents now that the storm is over; he asks them if they would like some water, to which they quickly reply "No!"

Production

Writing
"Agua Mala", which was written by David Amann (making it his second story for The X-Files after "Terms of Endearment"), went through several very different drafts. Amann was originally tasked with bringing back the character of Arthur Dales, and his first story revolved around a monster lurking in an abandoned gold mine. Frank Spotnitz, the show's executive producer, was not drawn to the mine aspect, but he enjoyed the concept of a monster running amok in an enclosed space. Amann subsequently redeveloped the idea, setting the episode during a hurricane and featuring a sea monster as the primary antagonist. Originally, the sea monster was blown onto dry land and crawled into the building before Amann decided to re-write it as living water.

Director Rob Bowman was worried that the episode's monster would not be "scary" and thus the story would not be "compelling". Bowman therefore used unique camera angles and quick cuts to make the episode feel "a hell of a lot better than [he] was afraid it might". The monster itself was created by special effects makeup supervisor John Vulich, a task he considered "the single most difficult thing [he] did all season". The tentacles were created out of a combination of silicone and urethane. The "octopus bite marks" numbered in the hundreds and required 90 minutes to apply.

The episode's title, "Agua Mala", means bad water in Spanish. Aguamala is also the slang name for the Portuguese Man o' War, a venomous jellyfish similar in form to the episode's primary antagonist.

Casting
Darren McGavin appears in this episode as Arthur Dales, making this his second episode in the series after being introduced in "Travelers". McGavin, noted for his role in Kolchak: The Night Stalker, was originally the casting directors' first choice for the role of Senator Matheson in the second season episode "Little Green Men". McGavin was later sought out to play the role of Mulder's dad. In the end, McGavin finally agreed to appear on the show playing Arthur Dales, the agent who founded the X-Files. McGavin was also slated to appear in the Duchovny-penned episode "The Unnatural", but two days into production, he suffered a stroke, forcing the producers to remove his scenes and replace them with another "Arthur Dales", played by M. Emmet Walsh.

Filming
The episode was notable both for the amount of water required and for its near-lack of vibrant light. Regarding the latter, Bowman did not film "anything for that episode during daylight, or with anything brighter than a flashlight or an emergency lamp in the hallway". the director also explained that "Agua Mala" was difficult to film because when a crew or cast member got too wet, they "had to stop everything to dry them off". Gillian Anderson and David Duchovny, in particular, were "water-logged" for a majority of the episode's filming. Anderson later joked, "I mean, we got drenched. It was like we were back in Vancouver!" (The show had previously filmed in Vancouver from season one to five before moving to Los Angeles, California, at the beginning of the sixth season.) During filming, costume designer Christine Peters was required to bring six dry replicas of each character's wardrobe to prevent pneumonia.

The apartment featured in the episode was built from scratch on a sound stage. Production designer Corey Kaplan received the script for "Agua Mala" around Christmas and, realizing the amount of work, immediately began drawing up plans for the set. When production for the episode wrapped, the entire set was thrown away because it had been ruined by the water.

Reception

Ratings
"Agua Mala" first aired in the United States on February 21, 1999. This episode earned a Nielsen rating of 10.1, meaning that roughly 10.1 percent of all television-equipped households were tuned in to the episode. It was viewed by 16.90 million viewers. The episode aired in the United Kingdom and Ireland on Sky1 on June 6, 1999, and received 0.95 million viewers, making it the third most watched episode that week. Fox promoted the episode with the tagline "Tonight, a creature living in our water has just gotten thirsty, for us."

Reviews
The episode received mixed to negative reviews from critics. Michael Liedtke and George Avalos, in a review of the sixth season in The Charlotte Observer, called the episode "just plain bad". Emily VanDerWerff of The A.V. Club roundly criticized the episode and awarded it a "D−", calling it "a famously bad episode of The X-Files." She noted that "the worst thing about 'Agua Mala' is that it comes so very, very close to working that it’s frustrating to see just how little it actually does" due to its bizarre structure and convoluted antagonist. VanDerWerff criticized Darren McGavin's appearance in the episode, calling it a "glorified cameo", and noted that his character functions as the "kind of old man who stands on his porch and yells about the good old days to the neighborhood kids." She did however, call the shot of the "writhing tentacle in the overhead lamp" the "one good thing" in the episode. Robert Shearman and Lars Pearson, in their book Wanting to Believe: A Critical Guide to The X-Files, Millennium & The Lone Gunmen, rated the episode one-and-a-half stars out of five, writing that the episode's "laughs aren't clever, and the scares are silly".

Not all reviews were completely negative; others were more mixed. Tom Kessenich, in his book Examination: An Unauthorized Look at Seasons 6–9 of the X-Files gave the episode a mixed review, writing "as far as [Monsters of the Weeks] go, 'Agua Mala' was pretty standard fare." However, he criticized the episodes resolution, noting that Scully should have had no way to know pure water would kill the creature. Paula Vitaris from Cinefantastique gave the episode a mixed review and awarded it two stars out of four. Vitaris wrote that, "'Agua Mala' won't end up on anybody's 'best of' list, but it's so silly that it's sort of fun." Timothy Sexton from Yahoo! News named "The Hurricane Monster" as one of "The Best X-Files Monsters of the Week", writing, "I'll tell you one thing about this X-Files episode and this X-Files monster: you'll never go to the bathroom during a rainstorm again without thinking twice."

Awards
"Agua Mala" earned an ASC Award by the American Society of Cinematographers for Outstanding Achievement in Cinematography – Regular Series.

See also
 List of unmade episodes of The X-Files

Footnotes

Bibliography

External links

 

The X-Files (season 6) episodes
1999 American television episodes
Television episodes set in Florida